MassTransit may refer to:

 Mass transit, public transportion
 MassTransit, Massachusetts Bay Transportation Authority, an eastern-Massachusetts mass-transit agency
 MassTransit-Project, open-source, .NET-based software
 MassTransit Enterprise, a managed file transfer server
 MassTransit, converter software between mass-spectrometry-data formats

See also 
 Mass transit (disambiguation)